Lemna obscura is a species of plant in the subfamily Lemnoideae of the famly Araceae. It ranges from the United States south to Colombia and Ecuador.

References

Lemnoideae
Flora of Ecuador
Taxonomy articles created by Polbot
Taxobox binomials not recognized by IUCN